McLane is a surname. Notable people with the surname include:
 Allen McLane (1746–1829), officer in the Continental Army during the American Revolution
 Ann McLane Kuster (born 1956), American lawyer and author
 David McLane, Las Vegas promoter
 David McLane (merchant) (ca. 1767–1797), a merchant from Providence, RI
 Derek McLane (born 1958), English born American set designer
 Drayton McLane, Jr. (born 1936), American entrepreneur
 Ed McLane (1881–1975), American baseball player
 Eddie McLane (1899–1980), American sports coach
 George R. McLane (1819–1855), American physician and politician, grandson of Allen McLane
 Harvey McLane, Canadian provincial politician
 Jimmy McLane (1930–2020), former United States swimmer
 John McLane (1852–1911), American furniture maker and politician
 Kim McLane Wardlaw (born 1954), U.S. federal judge in California
 Louis McLane (1786–1857), American lawyer and politician, son of Allen McLane
 Malcolm McLane (1924-2008), American lawyer, businessman, and politician
 M. Jean McLane (1878–1964), American  portraitist
 Patrick McLane (1875–1946), American politician 
 Ralph McLane (1907–1951), American clarinetist
 Robert Milligan McLane (1815–1898), American  politician, military officer, and diplomat
 S. Brooks McLane, American physicist
 Susan McLane (1929-2005), American politician
 Val McLane (born 1943), English actress, scriptwriter and director
 William McLane (Pennsylvania politician), 20th century American politician
 William McLane (Washington state), 19th century American politician

Other 
 McLane Company, a supply chain services company, founded by Drayton McLane, Jr., now owned by Berkshire Hathaway
 McLane Advanced Technologies, founded by Drayton McLane, Jr.
 Drayton McLane Baseball Stadium at John H. Kobs Field
 John McClane, character portrayed by Bruce Willis in the Die Hard movies
 USRC Louis McLane later USRC Delaware
  USRC McLane (1832) revenue cutter
 
 McLane Stadium
 McLane–Ocampo Treaty
 General McLane High School in Erie County, Pennsylvania
 General McLane School District
 McLane High School in Fresno, California

See also
 MacLane
 MacLaine
 Maclean
 McClain (disambiguation)
 McClean (disambiguation)